Jeewaka Shashen (born 27 October 2003) is a Sri Lankan cricketer. He has played for the Sri Lanka national under-19 cricket team, and made his List A debut on 23 November 2021, for Negombo Cricket Club in the 2020–21 Major Clubs Limited Over Tournament.

References

External links
 

2003 births
Living people
Sri Lankan cricketers
Negombo Cricket Club cricketers
Place of birth missing (living people)